The Ethiopian snout-burrower (Hemisus microscaphus), also known as the Lake Zwai snout-burrower or Lake Zwai shovelnose frog, is a species of frog in the family Hemisotidae, endemic to Ethiopia.

Its natural habitats are subtropical or tropical dry forests, dry savanna, subtropical or tropical high-altitude grassland, rivers, swamps, intermittent freshwater marshes, freshwater springs, and heavily degraded former forests.
It is threatened by habitat loss.

References

Hemisus
Amphibians of Ethiopia
Endemic fauna of Ethiopia
Taxonomy articles created by Polbot
Amphibians described in 1972